Ansia de Amar (Eng.: Longing to Love') is the title of a studio album by Mexican Norteño-Sax Conjunto Primavera released on April 3, 2001. This album became their second number-one hit on the Billboard Top Latin Albums chart.
Finally, this is the first album without re-recordings since Amigo mesero of 1994, because the next albums until Morir de Amor have re-recordings.
This album was the first of drummer Daniel Martinez, after the departure of Adán Huerta in 2000.

Track listing 
This track listing from Billboard.com.
 No Te Podias Quedar (Ramón González) — 3:56
 Quiero Verte Otra Vez (Eloy Bernal) — 2:16
 Irremediablemente (Marco Pérez/René Trevizo) — 3:29
 No Sé Vivir Sin Ti (Gerardo Franco) — 3:34
 Regresa a Mi Lado (Miguel Angel Meléndez) — 2:19
 De Golpe en Golpe (Teodoro Bello) — 2:59
 Derecho a la Vida (Cuco Sánchez) — 3:26
 El Más Triste (Jesse Armenta) — 2:47
 Si Te Vuelvo a Ver (Dario Mirana) — 3:23
 Amiga (Lito Solanas) — 3:01

Credits 
This information from Allmusic.
 Conjunto Primavera: Artistic director
 Jesús Guillén: Executive producer
 Mario Alanis: Engineer
 Marin Morales: Engineer
 Gilbert Velasquez: Mixing
 Víctor Manuel Mata: Art direction, artistic director
 John Coulter: Graphic design
 Henry Brun: Photography

Chart performance

Sales and certifications

References 

2001 albums
Conjunto Primavera albums
Fonovisa Records albums